Massimo Pacetti (born August 22, 1962) is a Canadian politician from Quebec, Canada. Pacetti was first elected to the House of Commons of Canada in a 2002 by-election and continued as the Member of Parliament for Saint-Léonard—Saint-Michel sitting with the Liberal caucus until 2014; he served his last year of office as an Independent MP.

Life and career
Born in Montreal, Quebec, Pacetti is a former accountant and entrepreneur, and former commissioner of the Pointe-de-l'Île school board.

Pacetti ran as the Liberal candidate in a by-election in 2002 for a seat in the Canadian House of Commons and was elected in the riding of Saint-Léonard—Saint-Michel. He was re-elected in the 2004, 2006, 2008 and 2011 general elections.

In May 2009, he introduced bill C-302, an "Act to recognize the injustice that was done to persons of Italian origin through their "enemy alien" designation and internment during the Second World War, and to provide for restitution and promote education on Italian-Canadian history [worth $2.5 million]" which was passed by the House of Commons on April 28, 2010. Canada Post was also to issue a commemorative postage stamp commemorating the internment of Italian-Canadian citizens, however, Bill C-302 did not pass through the necessary stages to become law.

Pacetti is the Vice–Chair of the Standing Committee on Finance (FINA) and the FINA Subcommittee on Agenda and Procedure.

Pacetti opposed Parliament studying the definition of a human being, saying "In reality, this is just a back door to reopen the debate over abortion in Canada, and a debate that has been closed for many years."

On November 5, 2014, Pacetti and fellow MP Scott Andrews were both suspended from the Liberal Party caucus by leader Justin Trudeau, following allegations of harassment laid by two unnamed New Democratic Party MPs (in 2018 it was revealed that one of the MP was Christine Moore). Both Andrews and Pacetti sat for the remainder of the parliament as independent MPs pending investigation of the complaints. Pacetti announced on March 18, 2015 that he would not be running in the October 2015 federal election, however he continued to maintain that he is innocent of sexual misconduct. It had been reported that Trudeau had intended to meet Pacetti and Andrews later that day to inform them that they were being permanently expelled from the Liberal caucus and would not be allowed to run as Liberals in the next election.

Electoral record

|align="left" colspan=2|Liberal hold
|align="right"|Swing
|align="right"| -0.3
|align="right"|

References

External links
Official website

1962 births
Canadian accountants
People from Saint-Leonard, Quebec
Canadian people of Italian descent
Liberal Party of Canada MPs
Living people
Members of the House of Commons of Canada from Quebec
Politicians from Montreal
Independent MPs in the Canadian House of Commons
Concordia University alumni
21st-century Canadian politicians